Joaquín Valdés (22 September 1906 – 30 August 1957) was a Salvadoran military officer who served as the Minister of National Defense from 1931 to 1935 and as Co-Chairman of the Civic Directory in December 1931.

Biography 

Joaquín Valdés was born on 22 September 1906 in San Salvador, El Salvador. He joined the Salvadoran Army and rose to the rank of Colonel.

On 2 December 1931, the Army staged a coup and deposed President Arturo Araujo. Valdés and Osmín Aguirre y Salinas appointed themselves as Co-Chairmen of the Civic Directory of El Salvador The Civic Directory was dissolved on 4 December 1931 and handed the Presidency to former Vice President Brigadier General Maximiliano Hernández Martínez.

Hernández Martínez appointed Joaquín Valdés to be his Minister of National Defense on 4 December 1931. He served until 1 March 1935 when he was replaced by Brigadier General Andrés Ignacio Menéndez.

Joaquín Valdés died in San Salvador, El Salvador, on 30 August 1957.

See also 

Civic Directory
Minister of National Defense of El Salvador

References 

1906 births
1957 deaths
Defence ministers of El Salvador
Leaders who took power by coup
Salvadoran military personnel
People from San Salvador